Gerald Hamer (16 November 1886 – 6 July 1972) was a British actor, born at  Llandudno, Wales as Geoffrey Earl Watton to John Watton and Evelyn Clara (née Earl).

Hamer worked in the United States, where he played primarily British characters in Hollywood films. He made a number of appearances in the Basil Rathbone series of Sherlock Holmes films in a variety of different roles.

Selected filmography

 Three Witnesses (1935) - (uncredited)
 Swing Time (1936) - Eric Lacanistram (uncredited)
 Angel (1937) - Barker's Footman (uncredited)
 Blond Cheat (1938) - Waiter
 Sweethearts (1938) - Harry (uncredited)
 The Saint Strikes Back (1939) - Val's Butler (uncredited)
 Bulldog Drummond's Bride (1939) - Garvey
 The Light That Failed (1939) - Soldier (uncredited)
 This Above All (1942) - Porter (uncredited)
 Sherlock Holmes in Washington (1943) - Alfred Pettibone a.k.a. John Grayson (uncredited)
 Sherlock Holmes Faces Death (1943) - Langford
 The Lodger (1944) - Milkman (uncredited)
 The White Cliffs of Dover (1944) - Private (uncredited)
 The Scarlet Claw (1944) - Potts, Tanner, Ramson
 Enter Arsene Lupin (1944) - Doc Marling
 Hi, Beautiful (1944) - One of Bearded Twins (uncredited)
 The Suspect (1944) - Griswold (uncredited)
 Pursuit to Algiers (1945) - Kingston
 Confidential Agent (1945) - Waiter (uncredited)
 Terror by Night (1946) - Alfred Shallcross (uncredited)
 Ivy (1947) - Man from Paris Office (uncredited)
 Lured (1947) - Harry Milton (uncredited)
 The Sign of the Ram (1948) - Vicar Woolton (uncredited)
 The Secret of St. Ives (1949) - Hudson - the Footman (uncredited)
 Challenge to Lassie (1949) - Diner (uncredited)
 Lorna Doone (1951) - Doctor (uncredited)
 Gaby (1956) - Newsboy (uncredited)
 Susan Slade (1961) - White's Butler (uncredited)

References

External links

1886 births
1972 deaths
People from Llandudno
British male film actors
20th-century British male actors
Place of death missing